Hillcrest Apartments is a historic three-story building in Ogden, Utah. It was built in 1923 for investor Charles Reveliotis, an immigrant from Greece who became a wrestling and boxing impresario in Ogden. Reveliotis, also known as Revell, was a member of the Church of Jesus Christ of Latter-day Saints, and a high priest of its Webster Heights stake; he died in 1960. The building has been listed on the National Register of Historic Places since December 31, 1987.

References

Buildings and structures in Ogden, Utah
National Register of Historic Places in Weber County, Utah
Late 19th and Early 20th Century American Movements architecture
Residential buildings completed in 1923
1923 establishments in Utah